Cascade (stylized as CASCADE) is a Japanese visual kei rock band, with a sound not typical of others in the movement, in that it is strongly influenced by new wave music. The band formed in 1993 and disbanded in August 2002, but six years later the band reunited and released a new album in 2009, Vivo.

History
Cascade's song "S.O.S. Romantic" was covered by Mix Speakers, Inc on the compilation Crush! -90's V-Rock Best Hit Cover Songs-, which was released on January 26, 2011, and features current visual kei bands covering songs from bands that were important to the '90s visual kei movement. Their song "Flowers of Romance" was covered by Adapter. on Crush! 2 -90's V-Rock Best Hit Cover Songs-, its sequel released on November 23, 2011.

Members
Tama (Vocals) was born on January 13, in Kyoto.
Masashi (Guitar) was born on November 30, in Kagoshima.
Hiroshi (Drums) was born September 18, in Okayama.

Former members
Kagemary (Synth)
Miyuki (Bass)
Q-Shi (Drums)
Makko (Bass) was born on June 24, in Yamanashi.

Discography

Singles
"Narikiri Bonnie and Clyde" (なりきりボニー&クライド, 1996/9/21)
"Oh Yeah Baby" (1997/3/21)
"Yellow Yellow Fire" (1997/6/21)
"Super Car" (スーパーカー, 1997/11/21) Oricon Weekly Single Chart Top Position: 30
"S.O.S Romantic" (S.O.S ロマンティック, 1998/4/22) Oricon Weekly Single Chart Top Position: 17
"Flowers of Romance" (1998/8/12) Oricon Weekly Single Chart Top Position: 5
"Cuckoo" (1998/11/11) Oricon Weekly Single Chart Top Position: 10
"Memories" (メモリーズ, 1999/1/27) Oricon Weekly Single Chart Top Position: 13
"Azayakana Kiseki" (アザヤカナキセキ, 1999/2/24) Oricon Weekly Single Chart Top Position: 26
"Dance Capriccio" (1999/10/27) Oricon Weekly Single Chart Top Position: 15
"Congracche" (コングラッチェ, 2000/1/26) 9th Ending Theme of Japanese Anime Kindaichi Case Files, Oricon Weekly Single Chart Top Position: 28
"Tokyo Darling" (TOKYOダーリン, 2000/5/17)
"Sexy, Sexy," (2000/11/16) Ending Theme of Japanese Anime Ghost Stories, Oricon Weekly Single Chart Top Position: 25
"Strawberry Moon" (2001/4/25)
"Partiful Saruman Life" (2010/4/13)
"Bonnou Hakusho Part 2" (2011/2/2)

Albums

Viva! (1995/11/22) Oricon Weekly Album Chart Top Position: 55
Beautiful Human Life (1996/3/23) Oricon Weekly Album Chart Top Position: 71
Samurai Man (サムライマン, 1996/10/23) Oricon Weekly Album Chart Top Position: 49
Apollo Exercise (1997/3/25)
Yellow Magical Typhoon (1997/7/24) Oricon Weekly Album Chart Top Position: 31
80*60=98 (1998/6/17) Oricon Weekly Album Chart Top Position: 6
Kodomo Z (コドモZ, 1999/3/25) Oricon Weekly Album Chart Top Position: 8
Piaza (ピアザ, 2000/2/23) Oricon Weekly Album Chart Top Position: 18
Adrenalin No.5 (2000/6/14) Oricon Weekly Album Chart Top Position: 15
Butterfly Limited Express (2001/6/13) Oricon Weekly Album Chart Top Position: 33
Viva Nice Best (2002/9/19) Oricon Weekly Album Chart Top Position: 46
Vivo (2009/4/15)
Magallanica (2010/5/19)

Video releases
Macaroni (マカロニ, 1996/6/21) VHS
Teritori-Machinegun (1997/4/23) VHS
Kageki na Bouryoku (カゲキな暴力 CASCADE SHOW AT BUDOKAN, 1998/3/21) VHS
Komanchi (コマンチ, 1999/6/23) VHS and DVD
Risutora Shite Kudasai yo (リストラして下さいよ。, 2000/11/8)
Viva Nice DVD (2002/11/21) DVD
Last Tour 2002 Omise Dekinai Noga Zannen Desuga (ラストツアー2002 お見せできないのが残念ですが Live at Osaka, 2002/11/21) DVD
Adios (2003/8/30) DVD

References

External links
 Official website
 Official Facebook
 Official YouTube
 Cascade at Universal Music 

Visual kei musical groups
Japanese new wave musical groups
Japanese rock music groups
Japanese pop rock music groups
Musical groups established in 1993
Musical groups disestablished in 2002
Musical groups reestablished in 2009
Japanese musical trios
1993 establishments in Japan
2002 disestablishments in Japan
2009 establishments in Japan